Jessica Fellowes (born 1974) is an English author and freelance journalist. She is the niece of Julian Fellowes (Baron Fellowes of West Stafford).

Career 

Fellowes was assistant editor of Marketing Business from October 2000 to July 2001; co-ordinating editor of "Night & Day" for The Mail on Sunday from November 2001 to January 2003; and deputy editor of Country Life magazine from June 2004 until March 2008. 

She was a columnist for The London Paper, and also writes for the Daily Telegraph, Telegraph Weekend, Psychologies and The Lady.

The Mitford Murders is her debut series as a novelist.

Books 
Mud and the City: Dos and Don'ts for Townies in the Country (2008) Book Guild Publishing 
The Devil You Know: Looking Out for the Psycho in Your Life (2011) with Kerry Daynes, Coronet 
The World of Downton Abbey (2011) Harper Collins, 
The Chronicles of Downton Abbey (2012) Harper Collins, 
A Year in the Life of Downton Abbey: Seasonal Celebrations, Traditions, and Recipes (2014) St. Martin's Press, 
Downton Abbey - A Celebration: The Official Companion to All Six Seasons (2015) St. Martin's Press, 
The Wit and Wisdom of Downton Abbey (2015) St. Martin's Press, 
The Mitford Murders (series)
The Mitford Murders (2017)
The Mitford Affair (was Bright Young Dead) (2018) 
The Mitford Scandal (2019)
The Mitford Trial (2020)
The Mitford Vanishing (2021)
The Mitford Secret (2022)

References

External links 
Official website
Biography and photo on Edwardian Promenade

Living people
English writers
English women non-fiction writers
English women journalists
Country Life (magazine) people
1974 births
People educated at Blackheath High School